The first Ramelow cabinet was the state government of Thuringia between 2014 and 2020, sworn in on 5 December 2014 after Bodo Ramelow was elected as Minister-President by the members of the Landtag of Thuringia. It was the 7th Cabinet of Thuringia.

It was formed after the 2014 Thuringian state election by The Left (LINKE), the Social Democratic Party (SPD), and Alliance 90/The Greens (GRÜNE). Excluding the Minister-President, the cabinet comprised nine ministers. Four were members of The Left, three were members of the SPD, and two were members of the Greens.

The first Ramelow cabinet left office on 5 February 2020 after Thomas Kemmerich was elected Minister-President.

Formation 

The previous cabinet was a coalition government CDU and SPD led by Minister-President Christine Lieberknecht.

The state election took place on 14 September, and resulted in small gains for the CDU and a substantial decline for the SPD. The Left and Greens remained steady on 28% and 6% respectively, while the AfD debuted at 11%. Overall, the incumbent coalition retained a slim majority of one seat.

The SPD's losses prompted the party to consider changing course and defecting from the outgoing government. A left-wing coalition of The Left, SPD, and Greens also held a one-seat majority. After holding exploratory talks with the other parties, they SPD carried out a postal ballot of their membership to gauge support for a coalition with The Left and Greens. The results were announced on 4 November, with 69.9% voting in favour. Turnout among the party's 4,300 members was 77.5%. The three parties thus entered into negotiations. They presented their coalition agreement on 19 November.

Bodo Ramelow was elected Minister-President by the Landtag on 6 December after two rounds of voting. In the first ballot, he received 45 votes in favour to 44 against, one short of the required majority. In the second ballot, he was elected with 46 votes in favour to 43 against. In both rounds, there was one abstention and one invalid vote.

Composition 
The composition of the cabinet at the time of its dissolution was as follows:

References

Notes

External links

Cabinets of Thuringia
Cabinets established in 2014
2014 establishments in Germany
2020 disestablishments in Germany
Cabinets disestablished in 2020